Gaunggaik is a village in Banmauk Township, Katha District, in the Sagaing Region of northern-central Burma.

References

Populated places in Katha District
Banmauk Township